In the United Kingdom, intergovernmental relations are the coordination and engagement between the UK Government and devolved governments in Scotland, Wales and Northern Ireland. The Prime Minister and Heads of Devolved Governments Council is where the heads of these administrations meet. 

There is also a portfolio-specific Interministerial Standing Committee (IMSC) and interministerial groups (IMG) affiliated to the IMSC. These were established in 2022 following a series of reviews. From 1999 to 2022, their predecessor the Joint Ministerial Committee (JMC), established by memorandums of understanding, served a similar purpose.

Tiered governance

Prime Minister and Devolved Heads of Government Council (tier 1) 
The Prime Minister and Devolved heads of Government Council (“the council”) consist of the Prime minister and the Devolved heads of Governments, the council is responsible for:

 Discussing UK level policies that require cooperation 
 Overseeing the other government organisations and mechanisms within the other tiers. 
 Acting as final arbiter for the UK dispute resolution mechanism.

Meetings

Interministerial Standing Committees (tier 2)

The Interministerial Standing Committee is lead by Michael Gove and is responsible for discussing areas of cooperation that cannot be discussed at the Portfolio Committee, the committee will have representatives from all 4 nations and aim to meet monthly.

There are currently 2 active intergovernmental committees.

Meetings

Interministerial Groups (tier 3) 

There are currently 7 active intergovernmental groups

Meetings

Dispute resolution mechanism 
There are 6 levels within the mechanism used settling disputes within the UK intergovernmental relations:

 UK and devolved governments 
 IGR secretariat
 Interministerial Standing Committee
 IGR Council

The IGR Council is the final arbiter in any disputes.

History 
Intergovernmental relations were previously governed by the Joint Ministerial Committee. On 20 January 2020, the Constitution Committee within the House of Lords published a report outlining the how the UK Government could improve intergovernmental relations. In 2022, the UK Government and devolved governments came to an agreement on the intergovernmental relations in the UK.

Joint Ministerial Committee (1999 to 2022)
The JMC was created in 1999 by Tony Blair's Labour government, and sought to act as a focus for the coordination of the relationships between these administrations. The terms of reference for the JMC were:
To consider non-devolved matters which impinge on devolved responsibilities, and devolved matters which impinge on non-devolved responsibilities.
Where the UK government and the devolved administrations so agree, to consider devolved matters if it is beneficial to discuss their respective treatment in different parts of the UK.
To keep the arrangements for liaison between the UK government and the devolved administrations under review.
To consider disputes between the administrations.

Membership
Before it was replaced, the membership of the JMC Plenary (JMC(P)) was:
 Prime Minister and Minister for the Union, who acts as chair of the JMC.
 Secretary of State for Levelling Up, Housing and Communities, Minister for Intergovernmental Relations
 First Minister of Scotland
 First Minister of Wales
First Minister and deputy First Minister of Northern Ireland
The following may also attend sessions of the JMC:
Deputy Prime Minister of the United Kingdom or First Secretary of State (if in office)
The Secretary of State for Foreign and Commonwealth Affairs
The secretaries of state for Scotland, Wales and Northern Ireland.
 Other Secretaries of State when issues relating to their remit are discussed.

Meetings
Since its creation in 1999, there had been several different JMC meeting formats. Since 2010, there have been four types: plenary, Europe, domestic and European negotiations (created following the 2016 United Kingdom European Union membership referendum).

The JMC Plenary meetings were intended to occur at least once every year. However, no plenary meetings were held between 2002 and 2008. This was primarily because the UK, Scotland, and Wales governments were all controlled by the Labour Party, and as such ministers from the central and devolved governments could quickly and easily use informal links to coordinate policy. However, following the Scottish National Party's victory at the 2007 Scottish Parliament election this was no longer the case. So  JMC Plenary meetings were re-established, though on an ad hoc basis.

Under proposals outlined by Theresa May in October 2016, the JMC Plenary was to meet on a definite annual basis and would have rotated between London, Edinburgh, Cardiff and Belfast. It would have also published an annual report on its work and hoped to foster greater formal and informal links between ministers from each (devolved) government. However, these proposals were vetoed by Sinn Féin's Martin McGuinness.

The last JMC Plenary was convened by Theresa May on 19 December 2018, even though soon after he became Prime Minister in July 2019, Boris Johnson announced his intention to hold a JMC Plenary meeting as soon as possible.

See also
British–Irish Council, which includes the British and Irish Governments, the UK Devolved Administrations and the Crown Dependencies
Conference of Ministers-President, a similar body in Germany
Council of Australian Governments, a similar body in Australia
 European Council – Council of the European Union – General Affairs Council
First Ministers' conference and the Council of the Federation, similar bodies in Canada
Ministerial council
National Governors Association, a similar body in the United States of America
North/South Ministerial Council

References and notes

External links
GOV.UK: Intergovernmental Relations
Devolution of powers to Scotland, Wales and Northern Ireland
Memorandum of understanding and supplementary agreement

Devolution in the United Kingdom
1999 establishments in the United Kingdom